Kublanov is a Russian masculine surname, its feminine counterpart is Kublanova. It may refer to
Lev Kublanov (born 1946), Russian-American graphic artist
Mikhail Kublanov (1914–1998), Soviet scholar and historian of religion

Russian-language surnames